Bradley Mark Tarbuck (born 6 November 1995) is an English professional footballer who plays for Havant & Waterlooville as either a left wing-back or a winger.

Club career

Portsmouth
Tarbuck signed a two-year scholarship deal after spending many years in Portsmouth youth categories. On 14 August 2012 he made his professional debut, coming on as a 72nd minute substitute for Andy Higgins in a League Cup 3–0 defeat against Plymouth Argyle. He then spent the rest of the season in the academy, although he did play in a first-team friendly on 16 April 2013 scoring in a 2–1 win over Icelandic side IBV at Fratton Park.

Tarbuck returned to the Academy for the 2013–14 season; after scoring 12 goals and being the club's topscorer in the youth leagues, he was awarded a one-year professional deal 
on 9 May 2014. He made his league debut for Pompey on 1 November, replacing Miles Storey in the 82nd minute of a 3–0 home win over Carlisle United.

On 27 November 2014 Tarbuck joined Conference Premier side Dartford on loan until January. He returned to Pompey at the end of the 2014–15 season, but was released on 18 May 2015.

Dorchester Town
On 30 January 2015, after appearing sparingly, Tarbuck moved to Dorchester Town on a one-month loan. On 26 February Tarbuck's loan was extended for another month, and he was named Dorchester's player of the month.

On 10 August 2015, Tarbuck signed a short-term deal at Dorchester Town, he later extended the deal until the end of the season.

Havant & Waterlooville
On 24 May 2016, Tarbuck left Dorchester and signed for Havant & Waterlooville. Converted to a left wing-back by manager Lee Bradbury, he was a key unit in the club's two consecutive promotions.

On 1 October 2018, Tarbuck extended his contract with Hawks until 2020.

Career statistics

References

External links

1995 births
Living people
People from Emsworth
English footballers
Association football midfielders
Portsmouth F.C. players
Dartford F.C. players
Dorchester Town F.C. players
English Football League players
National League (English football) players
Havant & Waterlooville F.C. players